Brigadier General Marshall Magruder (12 October 1885 – 4 July 1956) was born in Washington, D.C. He served in both World War I and World War II. His son was noted aircraft designer Peyton M. Magruder. BG Magruder retired from the US Army in 1946. He was buried at Arlington National Cemetery in Section 30, Site 1092.

Career
 11 June 1935- 28 August 1935 Commanding Officer 13th Field Artillery Regiment
 1939–1940 Commanding Officer Armored Cavalry Regiment
 1942–1943 Commanding Officer 14th Field Artillery Brigade
 1943–1946 Member of War Department Manpower Board

References

 Generals from USA

United States Army generals
1885 births
1956 deaths
Burials at Arlington National Cemetery